Zégoua is a City and commune in the Cercle of Kadiolo in the Sikasso Region of southern Mali. The commune covers an area of 978 square kilometers and includes the town and 8 villages. In the 2017 census it had a population of 230,360. The city of Zégoua, the administrative center (chef-lieu) of the commune, is 2 km north of the border with the Ivory Coast and 14 km southeast of Kadiolo on the RN7, the main road linking Sikasso and Ouangolodougou.

References

External links
.

Communes of Sikasso Region